Cameroon competed at the 2014 Summer Youth Olympics, in Nanjing, China from 16 August to 28 August 2014.

Athletics

Cameroon qualified one athlete.

Qualification Legend: Q=Final A (medal); qB=Final B (non-medal); qC=Final C (non-medal); qD=Final D (non-medal); qE=Final E (non-medal)

Girls
Track & road events

Swimming

Cameroon qualified one swimmer.

Boys

Taekwondo

Cameroon was given a wild card to compete.

Girls

References

2014 in Cameroonian sport
Nations at the 2014 Summer Youth Olympics
Cameroon at the Youth Olympics